Peter Keneth Rwamuhanda (11 December 1953 – 9 June 2008) was a Ugandan athlete who competed in the 400 metres hurdles.

Achievements

1984 Olympic Games - seventh place (4x400 metres relay)
1982 Commonwealth Games - silver medal
1982 East and Central African Championships - gold medal
1976 East and Central African Championships - gold medal

External links

1953 births
2008 deaths
Ugandan male hurdlers
Athletes (track and field) at the 1982 Commonwealth Games
Athletes (track and field) at the 1984 Summer Olympics
Commonwealth Games silver medallists for Uganda
Olympic athletes of Uganda
Commonwealth Games medallists in athletics
African Games bronze medalists for Uganda
African Games medalists in athletics (track and field)
Athletes (track and field) at the 1978 All-Africa Games
20th-century Ugandan people
21st-century Ugandan people
Medallists at the 1982 Commonwealth Games